Carolina ("Carla") Alwina Hubertina Beurskens (born 10 February 1952) was one of Holland's most prominent female long-distance runners from the second half of the 1970s until well into the 1990s, including all distances from 3000 metres to the marathon. During the greater part of this period she was most successful at the longer distance.

The variety of the twenty-three national titles she obtained during her long carrier clearly shows to what extent Beurskens dominated all aspects of the métier: three titles on indoor- and five on outdoor tracks, nine on the road and six in the cross country. At the long distances she is by far the most successful Dutch female athlete ever.

Carla Beurskens did not very often represent her native country in major international tournaments. She took part in the Summer Olympics twice: in Los Angeles 1984 and Seoul 1988, three times in European and one time in World Championships. For various reasons she never performed particularly well at those events. Her fifth place in the European Championships marathon of 1982 in Athens was her best achievement ever.

Much better were Beurskens’ achievements in the marathons of various big cities all over the world. For instance, with the exception of Kenya’s Tegla Loroupe, she is the only female athlete who won the Rotterdam Marathon more than once. And this although shortly after her first victory in 1984 she declared that in the future she would ignore Rotterdam, unless the circumstances for female competitors would improve drastically. Finally in 1990 the circumstances seemed to fulfil the conditions of the athlete from Limburg, because she appeared on the scene once more and won for the second time. Moreover, she became the first female in Rotterdam to realise a time within two-and-a-half hours: 2:29:47. She won the City-Pier-City Loop half marathon in the Hague four times (1984–86, 1990).

Carla Beurskens ran her personal best (2:26:34 hours) on November 15, 1987, in the Tokyo Marathon, finishing second behind triple winner Katrin Dörre. This Dutch national record stood for nearly thirteen years. It was finally broken on November 2, 2003, by the Dutch Kenyan Lornah Kiplagat at the New York Marathon: 2:23:43. Beurskens was also victorious in the Nagoya marathon in Japan in 1987, finishing in 2:28:27, taking into account the bad weather conditions (some snow showers on the way), in Eindhoven in 1995 and Enschede in 1997, both towns in The Netherlands. She won the Parelloop 10 km in race in the Netherlands in 1993 

Eight out of the ten times she participated in the Honolulu Marathon in Hawaii, she carried off the palm, for the first time in 1985. A two-week vacation offer came together with the invitation for this event. She took part without being fully prepared and won straightaway. In the following years up to 1994 her series of victories was only interrupted in 1988 and 1991. With her eight victories in Hawaii she is the most successful female marathon runner ever. Nowadays she is invited by the organizers to be present at the event as a guest of honour.

Achievements

References 

Stalman, R. (1986) Profiel van Carla Beurskens. Atletiekwereld nr. 5: KNAU
Ploeg, H. v.d. (1987) Programma Carla Beurskens nog een groot vraagteken. Atletiekwereld nr. 4: KNAU
Bijkerk, T. and Paauw, R. (1996) Gouden boek van de Nederlandse Olympiers. De Vrieseborch
Schoor, L. v.d. (1998) Carla Beurskens, het boegbeeld van de vrouwenmarathon. Atletiek nr. 2: KNAU

External links 

1952 births
Living people
Dutch female long-distance runners
Olympic athletes of the Netherlands
Athletes (track and field) at the 1984 Summer Olympics
Athletes (track and field) at the 1988 Summer Olympics
World Athletics Championships athletes for the Netherlands
People from Tegelen
Frankfurt Marathon female winners
Sportspeople from Limburg (Netherlands)